Cyril Akpomedah (born 2 May 1979) is a French former professional basketball player.

Youth career 
 1997–99:  Cholet Basket (Youth championship)

Professional career
During his pro career, Akpomedah played in the top-tier level French League, with AS Monaco.

National team career
Akpomedah was a member of the senior French national team, in 2005.

Awards and honors 
 French League Cup Winner: (2011)
 2× French Federation Cup Winner: (1998, 1999)
 Bosnia and Herzegovina League Champion: (2007)
 4× French League All-Star: (2004, 2007, 2009, 2010)
 French League blocks leader: (2011)

References

External links
  Cyril Akpomedah at lnb.fr
 Cyril Akpomedah at fiba.com
 Cyril Akpomedah at fibaeurope.com
 Cyril Akpomedah at eurobasket.com

1979 births
Living people
BCM Gravelines players
Cholet Basket players
French men's basketball players
Metropolitans 92 players
Power forwards (basketball)
Spirou Charleroi players
HKK Široki players